The A1 is a major route in Northern Ireland. It runs from Belfast via Lisburn and Banbridge to the border with the Republic of Ireland south of Newry, from where the road continues to Dublin, becoming the N1 road and M1 motorway. Between Sprucefield and Carrickcarnan the road forms part of the European route E01.

Recent developments
The A1 is dual carriageway south from Sprucefield but some junctions remain relatively low specification as they necessitate right-turning movements across the central reservation. The busier junctions have been improved by the provision of bridges or underpasses.

A flyover was constructed at the busy Rathfriland Road junction in Banbridge and an underpass at the very dangerous Hillsborough road junction in Dromore was completed in June 2005.

Improved junctions at Banbridge and Hillsborough opened in September 2009, at Loughbrickland in December 2009 and at Banbridge Road, Dromore in February 2010.

The scheme involving the dualling of the A1 between Beech Hill and Cloghogue was completed in July 2010, five months ahead of schedule.

Planned developments
The Roads Service of Northern Ireland has planned to provide four further grade separated junctions. These schemes are located at:
 Listullycurran Road, between Dromore and Hillsborough
 Gowdystown Road, south of Dromore
 Skeltons Road, between Dromore and Banbridge
 Waringsford Road, north of Banbridge.

Further measures envisaged to improve safety include a central reservation safety barrier to be constructed from the A1's junction with the M1 at Sprucefield to Loughbrickland. This will involve the closing of many of the dual carriageway's central cross-over points.

The Road Service also plan to improve the link between the M1 and A1 at Sprucefield in a scheme that would include a flyover at Hillsborough, replacing the last remaining roundabout on the route between Dublin and Belfast.

References

1
1
1
1